The Asia Pacific Bowls Championships formerly the Pacific Rim Championships was a lawn bowling competition held between national bowls organisations in the Asia Pacific region.  The event was inaugurated in 1985, and it was initially held every two years but then took place every four years and was a qualifying event for the World Outdoor Bowls Championships.

In 2021, the 2020 World Outdoor Bowls Championship was officially cancelled due to the COVID-19 pandemic. World Bowls then decided that the World Championships would take place every two years starting in 2023. This also resulted in the fact that qualifying events for the Championships were no longer required meaning the Atlantic Bowls Championships and Asia Pacific Championships were terminated.

1985 Tweed Heads, New South Wales, Australia
15-21 September (round robin - only 1 bronze awarded)

1987 Lae BC, Lae, Papua New Guinea
25 October - 8 November sponsored by Mazda (bronze medal playoffs took place)

1989 Suva, Fiji
Jul 8-21, sponsored by Mazda

1991 Kowloon CC & BC, Hong Kong, China
26 October - 10 November, sponsored by Mazda (bronze medal playoffs took place)

1993 Victoria BC, Victoria, British Columbia, Canada
25 July - 7 August, sponsored by Mazda (round robin, only 1 bronze)

1995 Dunedin, New Zealand
22 November - 2 December, two bronze medals awarded

1997 Warilla BC & RC, Warilla, New South Wales, Australia
19 November - 1 December, (round robin, only 1 bronze)

1999 Bukit Kiara Bowls Complex, Kuala Lumpur, Malaysia
September 21-30

2001 Moama, Melbourne, Australia
22 October - 4 November

2003 Pine Rivers Memorial BC, Brisbane Australia
25 November - 2 December

2005 Darebin International Sports Centre, Melbourne, Australia
7-16 November (bronze medal playoffs held)

2007 Burnside BC & Fendalton BC, Christchurch, New Zealand
13-21 January

2009 National Lawn Bowls Complex, Bukit Kiara, Kuala Lumpur, Malaysia
8-16 August

2011 Lockleys BC & Holdfast Bay BC, Adelaide, Australia
30 November - 11 December

2015 Burnside BC & Papanui BC, Christchurch - New Zealand
24 November - 6 December

2019 Broadbeach BC, Helensvale BC & Musgrave Hill BC, Gold Coast, Australia
June 18 to 28

See also
World Bowls Events

References

Bowls competitions
1985 establishments in Australia